CityKids is an American television series that aired late Saturday mornings on ABC from 1993 to 1994. The show consists primarily of live action performances, interspersed with Muppet segments, courtesy of Jim Henson Productions. These Muppets were composed of original characters designed specifically for the show, not ones taken from Sesame Street or The Muppet Show. These original characters often served as the Greek chorus for the show, commenting on the situations of the human characters, but not actually interacting with them.

Similar to NBC’s attempt of pushing the adolescent programming for late Saturday mornings with Saved By the Bell since 1989, CityKids was the first and only late Saturday morning series on ABC primarily targeted to a teenage audience, as well as the only one produced by the Jim Henson Company at the time, not to mention an urban one. However, the show failed to generate desirable ratings from any demographic, especially the teenage one, and the show was cancelled by ABC after one season, consequently airing strictly children’s programs on the network the following year.

The show's main theme song was composed by Malik Yoba & Raleigh J. Neal II, both of whom also composed other songs for the series and served as Musical Creative Supervisor for the show.

Plot

Characters

Humans
 Angelica (portrayed by Cyndi Cartagena)
 Snoopy/Christian (portrayed by Hassan Elgendi)
 John (portrayed by Dulé Hill)
 Susan (portrayed by Anne Ho])
 Tito (portrayed by Renoly Santiago)
 Nikki (portrayed by Diana Smith)
 David (portrayed by Brad Stoll)
 Frida (portrayed by Audrey Ince)
 Mr. Lester (portrayed by Don Chastain)
 Unknown Character (portrayed by Dash Mihok)
 Unknown Character (portrayed by Michelle Ingkavet)

Puppets
 Dread (performed by David Rudman) - A Rastafarian philosopher.
 Bird (performed by Joey Mazzarino) - A pigeon who is Dread's sidekick.
 Hot Dogs - A bunch of Hot Dogs that would perform songs. Their sketch would begin with a zoom in on the container they are being served in. The sketch ends with a bunch of tongs taking one of the hot dogs.
 Frankie Frank (performed by David Rudman) - An anthropomorphic hot dog rapper who is the leader of Frankie Frank and the Footers.
 Captain (performed by Joey Mazzarino) - A character who works "Inside the Head" with Libido and Lieutenant. In newspaper promotions of CityKids, the Captain was shown to have originally been depicted as a red bespectacled monkey before they went with the puppet design that appeared in the show.
 Libido (performed by John Henson) - A creature-like character that is black who works "Inside the Head" with Captain and Lieutenant.
 Lieutenant (performed by David Rudman) - A character who works "Inside the Head" with Captain and Libido.
 Koozebanians (performed by Noel MacNeal and David Rudman) - Three aliens from the planet Koozebane. Two of them have two eyes while one of them has one eye.
 Dirt Sisters - Trish (performed by Joey Mazzarino, voiced by Elizabeth Regen) and Toya (performed by David Rudman, voiced by Cenophia Mitchell) are two gossipy girls that talk to each other on the phone and talk about the episode's main plot. Trish is from Staten Island while Toya is from Brooklyn.

Episodes

Cast
 Cyndi Cartagena as Angelica
 Don Chastain as Mr. Lester
 Hassan Elgendi as Snoopy, Christian
 Dulé Hill as John
 Anne Ho as Susan
 Audrey Ince as Frida
 Michelle Ingkavet
 Dash Mihok
 Cenophia Mitchell as Toya (voice)
 Elizabeth Regen as Trish (voice)
 Renoly Santiago as Tito
 Diana Smith as Nikki
 Brad Stoll as David

Puppeteers
 John Henson as Libido
 Noel MacNeal as Koozebanians
 Joey Mazzarino as Bird, Captain, Trish
 Alison Mork
 Carmen Osbahr
 Don Reardon
 David Rudman as Dread, Frankie Frank, Lieutenant, Koozbanians, Toya
 Carlo Yanuzzi

Later appearances
 The puppet for Bird later appeared in Muppet Time where he is the straight man for the Three Silly Bears in their segments. This pigeon was also performed by Joey Mazzarino.
 The puppets for Dread, Captain, Lieutenant, Libido (now purple), the Hot Dogs, the Koozebanians, and the prototype Captain later made appearances in the Puppet Up! shows and other Jim Henson projects.
 The puppets for the Koozebanians later made appearances in Duff's Happy Fun Bake Time.

References

External links 
 
 TV Guide: CityKids Summary
 Retrojunk: CityKids
 The CityKids Foundation, Official Website

1990s American children's television series
1993 American television series debuts
1994 American television series endings
American Broadcasting Company original programming
American television shows featuring puppetry
Television series about teenagers
Television series by The Jim Henson Company
English-language television shows
Television shows set in New York City